Nass is an unincorporated community in Yakima County, Washington, United States, located approximately one mile east of Granger.

The community developed around a spur of the Northern Pacific Railway Company line. According to railroad historians, NASS stands for National Agricultural Statistics Service, although the community may have been named after people in the area with a last name of Nass.

References

Northern Pacific Railway
Unincorporated communities in Yakima County, Washington
Unincorporated communities in Washington (state)